Various polling organizations have been conducting opinion polling in specific ridings in the lead up to the 2019 Canadian federal election. The results of publicized opinion polling for individual constituencies are detailed in this article.

Opinion polls have been conducted from the months following the previous general election held in October 2015, and have increased in frequency leading up to the October 2019 general election.

Given the expense of polling individual constituencies, constituencies are usually only polled if they are of some particular interest, e.g. they are thought to be marginal or facing an impending by-election. The constituencies polled are not necessarily representative of a national average swing. Under the first-past-the-post electoral system the true marginal seats, by definition, will be decisive as to the outcome of the election.

Constituency polls

Alberta

Edmonton Mill Woods

Edmonton Strathcona

British Columbia

Burnaby South

Fleetwood—Port Kells

Kamloops—Thompson—Cariboo

Vancouver East

Vancouver Granville

Victoria

Manitoba

Elmwood—Transcona

Nova Scotia

Central Nova

Cumberland—Colchester

Sackville—Preston—Chezzetcook

Ontario

Barrie—Springwater—Oro-Medonte

Chatham—Kent-Leamington

Durham

Guelph

Kitchener Centre

Markham—Stouffville

Milton

Niagara Centre

Oakville

Ottawa Centre

Scarborough Centre

Simcoe North

Waterloo

Whitby

Windsor West

Prince Edward Island

Charlottetown

Quebec

Beauce

Beauport-Limoilou

Bécancour—Nicolet—Saurel

Beloeil-Chambly

Berthier—Maskinongé

Jonquière

Laurier—Sainte-Marie

Longueuil—Saint-Hubert

Louis-Hébert

Montmagny—L'Islet—Kamouraska—Rivière-du-Loup

Portneuf—Jacques-Cartier

Québec

Rosemont-La Petite-Patrie

Notes
Notes
 In cases when linked poll details distinguish between the margin of error associated with the total sample of respondents (including undecided and non-voters) and that of the subsample of decided/leaning voters, the latter is included in the table.  Also not included is the margin of error created by rounding to the nearest whole number or any margin of error from methodological sources. Most online polls—because of their opt-in method of recruiting panellists which results in a non-random sample—cannot have a margin of error. In such cases, shown is what the margin of error would be for a survey using a random probability-based sample of equivalent size.
 Refers to the total sample size, including undecided and non-voters.
 "Telephone" refers to traditional telephone polls conducted by live interviewers; "IVR" refers to automated Interactive Voice Response polls conducted by telephone; "online" refers to polls conducted exclusively over the internet; "telephone/online" refers to polls which combine results from both telephone and online surveys, or for which respondents are initially recruited by telephone and then asked to complete an online survey.
 Election Results shown for 2011 are the redistributed results for the 2015 districts.  These are fixed until 2023 under the present federal electoral system.  About 80% of the 308 districts defined in 2003 changed their borders or are entirely new:  338 districts were defined in 2015.
 Naming party only.
 Naming candidates.

References 

Opinion polling in Canada